Hemicladus is a genus of longhorn beetles of the subfamily Lamiinae.

 Hemicladus buqueti Tavakilian, Touroult & Dalens, 2010
 Hemicladus callipus Buquet, 1857
 Hemicladus decoratus Fuchs, 1955
 Hemicladus dejeanii Buquet, 1857
 Hemicladus fasciatus Galileo & Martins, 1991
 Hemicladus thomsonii Buquet, 1857

References

Calliini
Cerambycidae genera